Peter Curtis  (born 29 August 1945 ) is a former British professional tennis player. Curtis won one Grand Slam title in mixed doubles with his then-wife Mary Ann Eisel Curtis.

Grand Slam finals

Mixed doubles (1 title)

Career finals

Doubles (1 runner-up)

References

External links
 
 

1945 births
Living people
Grand Slam (tennis) champions in mixed doubles
English male tennis players
British male tennis players
Tennis people from Surrey
Sportspeople from Woking
US Open (tennis) champions